Mane may refer to:
Mane (horse), the line of hair along the spine of the neck
Mane (lion), the hair found around the male mammal's neck

In arts and entertainment
Mane (film) is a 1990 Kannada language film directed by Girish Kasaravalli
Mane (Dungeons & Dragons), a fictional demon in the Dungeons & Dragons fantasy role-playing game
Lion-Mane, three characters in DC Comics

Places
Mane Skerry, Antarctic island
Mané Department, a department in the Sanmatenga Province of Burkina Faso
French communes:
Mane, Alpes-de-Haute-Provence, in the Alpes-de-Haute-Provence département
Mane, Haute-Garonne, in the Haute-Garonne département
Mane Bhanjang, village in the state of West Bengal in India
Mane, an ancient city in what is now Syria or Iraq

People
Mane (clan), one of the Maratha clans; also one of the surnames of the clan people
Mane people or Manneh, African soldiers from the first half of the sixteenth century
Mane (surname) or Mané, a surname

As a given name
 Maneh (given name), an Armenian female name
 Mané, nickname for Manuel:
Garrincha (1933–1983), full name Manuel Francisco dos Santos, Brazilian footballer
Mané (footballer, born 1950), full name José Manuel Esnal Pardo, Spanish football manager
Mané (footballer, born 1981), full name José Manuel Jiménez Ortiz, Spanish footballer
Sadio Mané (footballer, born 1992), Senegalese footballer
Mane Bajić (1941–1994), Serbian football player
Mané de la Parra (born 1982), Mexican producer, songwriter, singer and actor

As a stage name
 Ghostemane (born 1991), American rapper and producer
 Gucci Mane (born 1980), American rapper
 Lil Ugly Mane (born 1984), American rapper and producer
 Tyler Mane (born 1966), American actor and former wrestler

Other meanings
Mane SA, a producer of flavors and fragrances
Mane Minister (born 1988), an American Thoroughbred racehorse

See also
 Maine (disambiguation)

ja:マネ